Josie Raymond is an American politician. She is a Democrat representing District 31 in the Kentucky House of Representatives.

Early life 

Raymond holds a Bachelor of Arts in Political Science and a Master of Science in Journalism from Columbia University, where she wrote for the campus newspaper, Columbia Daily Spectator. She also holds a Master of Arts in Teaching from Marian University. Her past experience includes working at the Student Success Center at the University of Louisville and with Teach for America.

Political career 

Raymond was elected to represent the 31st district in the Kentucky House of Representatives in 2018, replacing fellow Democrat Steve Riggs, who was retiring. She is running for re-election in 2020.

Electoral record

References 

Living people
Democratic Party members of the Kentucky House of Representatives
Columbia University Graduate School of Journalism alumni
Year of birth missing (living people)
Columbia College (New York) alumni
21st-century American politicians